Oren Ritter Lewis (October 7, 1902 – June 12, 1983) was a United States district judge of the United States District Court for the Eastern District of Virginia.

Education and career

Born in Seymour, Indiana, Lewis received a Bachelor of Laws from George Washington University Law School in 1939. He was in private practice in Arlington County, Virginia from 1940 to 1960.

Federal judicial service

On March 21, 1960, Lewis was nominated by President Dwight D. Eisenhower to a seat on the United States District Court for the Eastern District of Virginia vacated by Judge Charles Sterling Hutcheson. Lewis was confirmed by the United States Senate on May 31, 1960, and received his commission the same day. He was a member of the Judicial Conference of the United States from 1970 to 1973. He assumed senior status on January 1, 1974. He served in that capacity until his death.

Death

Lewis died of a heart attack suffered at his Arlington County home on June 12, 1983, dying at Arlington Hospital in Arlington County. He continued to preside over cases up until his death. Lewis is buried at the Columbia Gardens Cemetery in Arlington.

References

External links

 

1902 births
1983 deaths
Judges of the United States District Court for the Eastern District of Virginia
United States district court judges appointed by Dwight D. Eisenhower
20th-century American judges
People from Seymour, Indiana
George Washington University Law School alumni